Inquisitive semantics is a framework in logic and natural language semantics. In inquisitive semantics, the semantic content of a sentence captures both the information that the sentence conveys and the issue that it raises. The framework provides a foundation for the linguistic analysis of statements and questions.  It was originally developed by Ivano Ciardelli, Jeroen Groenendijk, Salvador Mascarenhas, and Floris Roelofsen.

Basic notions
The essential notion in inquisitive semantics is that of an inquisitive proposition.

 An information state (alternately a classical proposition) is a set of possible worlds.	
 An inquisitive proposition is a nonempty downward-closed set of information states.

Inquisitive propositions encode informational content via the region of logical space that their information states cover. For instance, the inquisitive proposition  encodes the information that } is the actual world.

An inquisitive proposition encodes inquisitive content via its maximal elements, known as alternatives. The inquisitive proposition  encodes the same information but does not raise an issue since it contains only one alternative.

The informational content of an inquisitive proposition can be isolated by pooling its constituent information states as shown below.

Inquisitive propositions can be used to provide a semantics for the connectives of propositional logic since they form a Heyting algebra when ordered by the subset relation.

Given a model  where W is a set of possible worlds and V is a valuation function:

 
 
 
 

The operators ! and ? are used as abbreviations in the manner shown below.

 
 

Conceptually, the !-operator can be thought of as cancelling the issues raised by whatever it applies to while leaving its informational content untouched. For example, if  is the inquisitive proposition P from a few paragraphs ago, then  is the inquisitive proposition Q.

The ?-operator trivializes the information expressed by whatever it applies to, while converting information states that would establish that its issues are unresolvable into states that resolve it. This is very abstract, so consider another example. Imagine that logical space consists of four possible worlds, w1, w2, w3, and w4, and consider a formula  such that  contains }, }, and of course . This proposition conveys that the actual world is either w1 or w2 and raises the issue of which of those worlds it actually is. Therefore, the issue it raises would not be resolved if we learned that the actual world is in the information state }. Rather, learning this would show that the issue raised by our toy proposition is unresolvable.

See also 
 Alternative semantics
 Disjunction
 Intermediate logic
 Question
 Responsive predicate
 Rising declarative

References

Further reading
 Ciardelli, Ivano; Groenendijk, Jeroen; and Roelofsen, Floris (2019) Inquisitive Semantics. Oxford University Press. 
 https://projects.illc.uva.nl/inquisitivesemantics/

Semantics
Non-classical logic
Systems of formal logic
Intuitionism
Philosophical logic